Holtville High School in Elmore County, Alabama serves grades 9-12 and is part of the Elmore County School System. As of 2008, the schools student body consisted of over 450 enrolled students and 40 staff members. The school offers 72 courses that include AP and dual enrollment college classes.

Campus
The campus houses nineteen classrooms, two science labs, a yearbook staff office, four teacher lounges, an agricultural green house and shop, three computer labs, a library with stage, a home economics center with three full kitchens, a band building, and a cafeteria. The athletic facilities include two gymnasiums with two basketball courts, one volleyball court, and a weight room. The athletic facilities also offers three tennis courts, a football and soccer field (Boykin Field), football field house, cheerleading building, practice field, baseball stadium, and softball stadium. During the summer of 2012, the school underwent construction to remodel the guidance office, main office, and convert the old cafeteria into a state-of-the-art science lab, as well as several exterior improvements.

Achievements

Academic
95% of the Class of 2007 passed all portions of the Alabama High School Graduation Exam. The passage rates were: Math - 100%; Language - 99%; Reading - 99%; Science - 96%; Social Studies - 95%. In 2007 testing 84% of the Class of 2009 scored proficient (Level III or IV) on the Alabama Direct Assessment of Writing. Scores increased from 70% proficient to 84% proficient. Narrative proficiency increased from 89% to 97%; persuasive proficiency increased from 64% to 87%; expository proficiency increased from 60% to 69%. Has obtained AYP every year since it has begun. Also, was named an Honours School in 2006–2007. In 2008 the school was rated number 3 in public schools in the state of Alabama. The school has graduated with a National Merit Finalist in 2009 and 2010.

Athletics
The varsity cheerleading squad obtained the title of national champions in December 2007. They earned this title at the WCA national championship in Nashville, Tennessee.

External links

Holtville High School

References

Public high schools in Alabama
Educational institutions established in 1929
Schools in Elmore County, Alabama
1929 establishments in Alabama